Little Swanport Tasmanian is an aboriginal language of Tasmania in the reconstruction of Claire Bowern. It was spoken near the modern town of Little Swanport on the east coast. Dixon & Crowley had noted that it appeared to be distinct, but were not sure if it constituted a separate language from other word lists collected near Oyster Bay.

The Little Swanport language is attested in a list of 211 words collected by George Augustus Robinson.

References

Eastern Tasmanian languages